The flag of the state of Connecticut is a white baroque shield with three grapevines, each bearing three bunches of purple grapes on a field of royal blue. The banner below the shield reads "Qui Transtulit Sustinet", Latin for "He who transplanted sustains", Connecticut's state motto.

History

The Connecticut General Assembly approved the flag in 1897 after it was introduced by Governor Owen Vincent Coffin in 1895. The designs were submitted by Abby Day Slocomb, the regent of the Anna Warner Bailey chapter of the Daughters of the American Revolution.

The design comes from the seal of Saybrook Colony, designed by George Fenwick when it was established in 1639. That seal depicted 15 grapevines and a hand in the upper left corner with a scroll reading "Sustinet qui transtulit". When Connecticut Colony bought Saybrook in 1644, the seal transferred to Connecticut Colony. On October 25, 1711, the governor and legislature changed the seal. They reduced the number of grapevines from 15 to three, in order to represent the three oldest settlements (Windsor, Wethersfield, and Hartford) (or possibly the three separate settlements,  Connecticut Colony, Saybrook Colony, and New Haven Colony, which had been absorbed into Connecticut by that time) and rearranged the wording and position of the motto.

In 2001, the North American Vexillological Association surveyed its members on the designs of the 72 U.S. state, U.S. territorial and Canadian provincial flags. The survey ranked the Connecticut flag 50th out of 72.

Flying the flag at half staff
Customarily, the flag of Connecticut is flown at half staff when the Federal flag is, which may be ordered by the President or by the Governor. According to 2007-R-0624, only the governor of Connecticut may decide that the state flag should be flown at half staff, though the right is a power of office and not a law.

Typically, the state flag is flown at half staff upon the death of a Connecticut resident serving in the armed forces, upon the death of a former governor or serving member of the state legislature, or for an event of great sorrow for Connecticut.

See also

State of Connecticut
Symbols of the state of Connecticut
Great Seal of the State of Connecticut
Coat of arms of Connecticut

References

External links
History of the Connecticut flag

Connecticut
Symbols of Connecticut
Flags of Connecticut
Connecticut
1897 establishments in Connecticut